Valerie Olson van Heest is an American author, explorer, and museum exhibit designer. She is co-founder of the Michigan Shipwreck Research Association.

Early life 
Valerie was born in Wilmette, Illinois. She graduated from New Trier East High School. Her father, Robert V. Olson, was the son a of Swedish immigrant, who volunteered at 17 to join the U.S. Navy at the outbreak of WW II. Robert was a Boatswain's mate and Underwater Demolition Team diver in the Pacific Theater. After the war, he encouraged his long time friend and neighbor Sam Davison to start the Davison Corporation to manufacture scuba gear. At 16 Valerie began working at the Dacor factory making scuba gear and became a certified scuba diver through the company's training program. She attended Harrington College of Design in Chicago and Loyola University and graduated with a B.A. in Interior Design. She worked at several architectural firms as a designer and project manager in Chicago.

Career 
In Chicago, she joined the Chicago Maritime Museum "dive group" and with others co-founded an offshoot organization, the Underwater Archaeological Society of Chicago where she served as its president for 8 years. During that time, she led investigations of over a dozen shipwrecks, and testified in the Lady Elgin case, The People of the State of Illinois ex rel. Illinois Historic Preservation Agency et al., Appellees, v. Harry Zych, d/b/a American Diving & Salvage Company, et al., Appellants, regarding her observations conducting an investigation of three sites of Lady Elgin wreckage strewn on the lake bottom.  

During that time, she co-authored reports on the shipwrecks Lady Elgin, Goshawk, and Wells Burt, and created archaeological site drawings on over a dozen shipwrecks.

After relocating to Holland, Michigan, she joined the Committee to establish the Southwest Michigan Underwater Preserve. In 2000, the state of Michigan approved Southwest Michigan Underwater Preserve as 10th underwater preserve.

Soon thereafter, van Heest, her husband Jack, Craig Rich, Geoffrey Reynolds, and others founded the Michigan Shipwreck Research Association specifically to research, explore, document, and interpret shipwrecks of Lake Michigan.  She is a co-director of that organization currently.

In 2006 Valerie was inducted into Women Divers Hall of Fame for her years of preserving and interpreting Great Lakes shipwrecks.

In 2007 the Historical Society of Michigan awarded van Heest the State History Award for distinguished volunteer service in promoting Michigan's submerged maritime heritage.

After the collaboration on Buckets and Belts in 2009, the co-author, William Lafferty and van Heest formed the museum exhibit design firm Lafferty van Heest and Associates.

At its annual event in Bowling Green, Ohio, International Legends of Diving added Van Heest to its Honor role in 2010

In 2017 van Heest  received the Joyce S. Hayward Award for Historic Interpretation from the Association for Great Lakes Maritime History.

Literary career 
Valerie van Heest has written numerous articles for several magazines and historical journals. including Michigan History, Wreck Diving Magazine, The Great Laker, Inland Seas, among others.

Van Heest began writing her first book in 2005. The recent MSRA discovery of the S.S. Michigan inspired her to find a way to share this story with her daughters by writing a young reader's book. Van Heest used her graphic art talents to create them herself.

After receiving an award from the Historical Society of Michigan for her first book, Icebound! The Adventures of Young George Sheldon and the SS Michigan, van Heest continued in a new direction by writing non-fiction books about Great Lakes shipwrecks and other historical topics.

While working with NUMA's Clive Cussler during the search for NWA Flight 2501, in 2006 Cussler encouraged her to write a book about that aircraft tragedy. That book, Fatal Crossing, was published in 2013. He wrote a "blurb" about the book that appears on the cover.

Michigan Shipwreck Research Association 
Van Heest is a co-founder of the Michigan Shipwreck Research Associates , a 501(c)3 non-profit corporation. Its mission is to preserve and interpret Michigan's submerged maritime history. The organization conducts side-scan sonar expeditions in search of shipwrecks and aircraft wrecks in Lake Michigan. Board members do research and documentation of submerged cultural resources and create educational resources including its website, and newsletter, documentary films, informative articles, books, and museum exhibits. Its Board of Directors make presentations to organizations of all kinds. Since 1998, MSRA hosts an annual public symposium to showcase its projects and those of other Great Lakes explorers.

Van Heest has been a leading member in the annual search expeditions in lower Lake Michigan resulting in the discovery of numerous shipwrecks, such as  the H.C. Akeley, SS Michigan, Hennepin, John V. Moran.

Personal life 
Valerie has been married to Jack van Heest since 1995. The couple has two daughters, both certified scuba divers. They live in Holland, Michigan.

Bibliography 

(*) indicates book co-authored with William Lafferty.

Selected documentaries 

On behalf of the Michigan Shipwreck Research Association, van Heest wrote or co-wrote and contributed to the production of the following shipwreck documentaries that she also presented at MSRA's annual Mysteries & Histories Beneath the Inland Seas in Holland, Michigan.

These programs were also presented at various annual underwater film festivals all around the Great Lakes including:

Our World Underwater Chicago, Illinois

Ford Seahorses' Great Lakes Shipwreck Festival  Ann Arbor, Michigan

Great Lakes Shipwreck Research Foundation's  Ghost Ships Festival Milwaukee, Wisconsin

Bay Area Diver's Shipwreck and Scuba, Sandusky, Ohio

The Niagara Divers' Association Annual Shipwrecks Symposium, "Shipwrecks + current year "  Welland, Ontario

Lake Superior Marine Museum Association's Gales of November, Duluth, Minnesota

National media appearances 

Valerie van Heest appeared in the following programs:

Valerie van Heest has also appeared or been interviewed on numerous newscasts and TV programs such as ABC news, Al Jazeera, CBS news, Fox news, NBC news, & MLive about her knowledge of shipwrecks and plane wrecks.

References

External links

Michigan Shipwreck Research Association website
Publishers website

American women non-fiction writers
American people of Swedish descent
American underwater divers
Living people
People from Chicago
People from Wilmette, Illinois
People from Holland, Michigan
Writers from Michigan
Writers from Chicago
Writers from Illinois
Year of birth missing (living people)
21st-century American women